The Mahajana Eksath Peramuna (People's United Front) is a political party in Sri Lanka. The party is currently led by Prime Minister Dinesh Gunawardena, son of Philip Gunawardena, the founder of the party.

History

Under Philip Gunawardena 
The MEP was founded in 1959 by Philip Gunawardena and PH William de Silva. The party was named after the Mahajana Eksath Peramuna (1956), an SLFP-led alliance which Gunawardena was a member of, after its disbandment that year.

During the March 1960 Ceylonese parliamentary elections, the MEP obtained 10 parliamentary seats. In the 1960s the group joined with the Lanka Sama Samaja Party and the Communist Party of Sri Lanka to form the United Left Front. On September 29, 1963, 800 delegates, representing a million workers, ratified a charter of 21 demands that sought to encapsulate the demands and goals of Sri Lankan workers.

National Government the United National Party 
In 1965, the party joined hands with Prime Minister Dudley Senanayake of the United National Party to form a national government under Senanayake's leadership. During this time, Philip Gunawardena was appointed as a cabinet minister.

Under Dinesh Gunawardana 
Following his father's death in 1972, Dinesh Gunawardena became the new leader of the MEP. In 1983, Dinesh Gunawardena became the common candidate to contest in the Maharagama by-election under the MEP's symbol, a cartwheel, in which he won with an overwhelming majority to become one of the 8 members of the opposition in the Sri Lankan Parliament.

In 1989, the MEP contested alone under the new proportional representation electoral system and won only 3 parliamentary seats out of 225, with Dinesh Gunawardena MP for Colombo District, Bandula Gunawardane MP for Colombo District and Gitanjana Gunawardena as a National List MP.

Peoples' Alliance 
In 2000, the MEP became one of the constituent members of the Peoples' Alliance, a political alliance led by the SLFP, where the MEP had 3 representatives in Parliament (Dinesh Gunawardena, Bandula Gunawardena and Somaweera Chandrasiri).

United People's Freedom Alliance 
In the 2004 Sri Lankan parliamentary elections, the party was part of the United People's Freedom Alliance, which won 45.6% of the popular vote and 105 out of 225 seats. There were two MEP representatives in the parliament including one National List MP. The two representatives were Minister of Urban Development and Sacred Areas Development and Chief Government Whip Dinesh Gunawardena and Housing Minister Gitanjana Gunawardena.

In the 2010 Sri Lankan parliamentary elections, the UPFA won nearly two-thirds of the Parliament, with 143 out of 225 seats.

Sri Lanka People's Freedom Alliance 
In 2019, the MEP joined the Sri Lanka People's Freedom Alliance, led by former president Mahinda Rajapaksa. In the 2020 Sri Lankan parliamentary elections, the SLFPA won a landslide victory, winning 145 out of 225 seats of the Parliament.

On 22 June, 2022, following the appointment of Ranil Wickremesinghe as the president of Sri Lanka, Wickremesinghe appointed MEP leader Dinesh Gunawardena as prime minister.

Electoral history

References

 
1959 establishments in Ceylon
Political parties established in 1959
Political parties in Sri Lanka
United People's Freedom Alliance